Safa Fatulla oghly Akhundov (19 June 1958, Masallı, Azerbaijan SSR - 1992, Shusha, Azerbaijan) was the National Hero of Azerbaijan and warrior during the First Nagorno-Karabakh War.

Early life and education 
Akhundov was born on June 19, 1958 in Masalli Rayon of Azerbaijan SSR. He received his first education in Saatli, then moved to Jalilabad, where he continued his education. In 1979 he graduated from Buquruslan Civil Aviation School.

Personal life 
Akhundov was married and had two children.

Nagorno-Karabakh war 
In 1987, Akhundov returned to Azerbaijan from Riga when the initial conflicts started between Azerbaijan and Armenia. In 1989, he was appointed the first officer of Zabrat “Azalaero” Mi-8 helicopter Company.

In January 1992, he carried out several flights to Shusha. His aircraft was hit by Armenians on January 28, 1992 during the next Aghdam-Shusha flight.

Honors  
Safa Fatulla oghly Akhundov was posthumously awarded the title of the "National Hero of Azerbaijan" by Presidential Decree No. 337 dated 25 November 1992. 

He was buried at a Martyrs' Lane cemetery in Baku.

See also 
 First Nagorno-Karabakh War
 List of National Heroes of Azerbaijan
 Azerbaijani Air and Air Defence Force
 1992 Azerbaijani Mil Mi-8 shootdown

References

Sources 
 Əbədiyyət yolçuları //Səhər.- 1992.- 27 noyabr.- S.2.
 Əsgərov V. Axundov Səfa Fətulla oğlu //Əsgərov V. Azərbaycanın Milli Qəhrəmanları.- B., 2005.- S.16-17.
Vüqar Əsgərov. "Azərbaycanın Milli Qəhrəmanları" (Yenidən işlənmiş II nəşr). Bakı: "Dərələyəz-M", 2010, səh. 27–28.
 Qəhrəmanın büstü açılmışdır: [Cəlilabadda] //Azərbaycan.-1996.- 15 may.-S.3.
 Mehdiyev S. Qorxmaz təyyarəçi //Odlar yurdu.- 1993.-11 fevral.- S.2.
 Səfərli M. Qəlblərdə yaşayır: [Şəhid təyyarəçi haqqında]//Azərbaycan.- 1998.- 11 iyul.- S.3.
 Süleymanov M. Sonuncu reys //Süleymanov M. Azərbaycanın səma şahinləri.- B., 1994.- S. 25.
 Şahmar E. İgidə el ağlayar //Şahmar E. Kövrək məhəbbətim Qubadlı.- B., 1994.- S.141-146.
 Zeynalov R. Axundov Səfa Fətulla oğlu: (1958-1992)//Zeynalov R. Azərbaycanın Milli Qəhrəmanları.- B., 1996.-S.11.

1958 births
1992 deaths
Azerbaijani military personnel
Azerbaijani military personnel of the Nagorno-Karabakh War
Azerbaijani military personnel killed in action
National Heroes of Azerbaijan
People from Masally District